Paris Métro Line 2 (French: Ligne 2 du métro de Paris) is one of the sixteen lines of the Paris Métro. Situated almost entirely above the former customs barrier around the capital (Boulevards extérieurs), it runs in a semicircle in the north of Paris.

As its name suggests, Line 2 was the second line of the Métro network to open, with the first section put into service on 13 December 1900; it adopted its current configuration on 2 April 1903, running between Porte Dauphine and Nation. There have been no changes in its layout since then.

At  in length, it is the ninth-busiest line of the system, with 105.2 million riders in 2017. In 1903, it was the location of the worst incident in the history of the Paris Métro, the fire at Couronnes.

History

Chronology
13 December 1900: The first portion of Line 2 Nord was opened between Porte Dauphine and Étoile.
7 October 1902: The line was extended from Étoile to Anvers.
31 January 1903: The line was extended from Anvers to Bagnolet.
2 April 1903: The line was extended from Bagnolet to Nation.
10 August 1903: A short circuit on a train caused a disastrous fire that killed 84 people at Couronnes and Ménilmontant stations.
14 October 1907: Line 2 Nord was renamed Line 2.

Works
On 30 March 1898 a déclaration d'utilité publique was published, recognising the public benefit of the first six planned lines of the Paris Métro.  In response, the city began rapidly constructing the first line in hopes of opening it in time for the 1900 World's Fair. During the first stage of development, three lines designated A, B, and C were planned for construction:
A: from Porte de Vincennes to Porte Dauphine.
B: circular route along the old city walls.
C: from Porte Maillot to Menilmontant, using line B tracks from Étoile to Batignolles.

However, after a detailed traffic study was conducted, changes were proposed to the tracks lying west of Étoile: the segment from Étoile to Porte Maillot of Line C would be integrated into Line A; Line C would pick up the segment from Étoile to Porte Dauphine. This change allowed trains on Line B to stop at Porte Dauphine. Porte Dauphine was thus designated the terminus and origin of Line B.

Shortly thereafter, Line B was split into two lines in hopes of simplifying its use. The section from Porte Dauphine to Nation was designated as Line 2 North; the remaining section from Nation to Étoile was designated Line 2 South. Line 2 South would eventually become Line 6.

The first  section of Line 2 was constructed at the same time as Line 1, opening only a little later on 3 December 1900. This section consisted of three stations (Porte Dauphine, Victor Hugo and Étoile) and was circulated by rolling stock consisting of three cars each. At Étoile, trains reversed direction via a track transfer (due to it serving as only a temporary terminus), while at Porte Dauphine and Nation direction was reversed using a turnaround loop.

Map and stations
This line counts 25 stations.

Renamed stations

Tourism
The elevated line between Barbès – Rochechouart and Jaurès stations offers views of Paris.
Metro line 2 passes near several places of interest :
Avenue Foch, which is the largest avenue in Paris, and the Arc de Triomphe.
Parc Monceau.
Pigalle and the Moulin Rouge.
Barbès and Belleville and their African and Asian influences.
Père Lachaise Cemetery.
Place de la Nation.

Gallery

See also

External links

English
 RATP English website
 Interactive Map of the RER (from RATP's website)
 Interactive Map of the Paris métro (from RATP's website)

French
 RATP official website
 Mobidf website, dedicated to the RER (unofficial)
 Metro-Pole website, dedicated to Paris public transports (unofficial)

 
Articles containing video clips
Railway lines opened in 1900